Miroljub Čavić was a Serbian basketball player.

Playing career 
Čavić played for a Belgrade-based team Crvena zvezda of the Yugoslav First League over nine seasons, from 1954 to 1962. He won two National Championships in his first two seasons with the Zvezda squads led by head coach Nebojša Popović. Čavić played over 130 games for the Zvezda and got promoted to the Zvezda's Club 100.

Career achievements 
 Yugoslav League champion: 2 (with Crvena zvezda: 1954, 1955).

See also 
 List of KK Crvena zvezda players with 100 games played

References

KK Crvena zvezda players
Serbian men's basketball players
Yugoslav men's basketball players
Year of birth missing
Year of death missing
Place of birth missing
Place of death missing